"Lady, Lady, Lady" is a 1983 song written by Giorgio Moroder and Keith Forsey and performed by singer Joe Esposito for the film Flashdance.

The song was released as a single from the soundtrack to the film. It was a minor hit on the Billboard Hot 100 chart, peaking at No. 86. It fared better on the Adult Contemporary chart, peaking at No. 36. The song peaked in the Austrian Single Charts at No. 7, in Switzerland at No. 19.

A remix of the song also appeared on Moroder's 1985 album Innovisions as "Lady Lady."

In 2017, the song was used in the film Call Me by Your Name.

References

1983 singles
1983 songs
Songs written for films
Songs written by Giorgio Moroder
Songs written by Keith Forsey
Joe Esposito (singer) songs
Pop ballads